Paradox is a German thrash metal/speed metal band formed in Würzburg in 1986.

History 
The group was formed in Würzburg in 1986 by two young musicians, Charly Steinhauer and Axel Blaha. Both of them were founding members of German cover bands of Overkill, Venom and Warhead since 1981. In February 1986, Markus Spyth joined on guitar and Roland Stahl on bass.

In July 1986, the band recorded a demo, drawing the attention of Roadrunner Records who went on to produce their first two albums. In 1987, their second demo "Mystery" was a success for the band, with the German press calling it the best demo of the year. In the same year, the band started recording their first album Product of Imagination, which contained 10 songs and lasted 40 minutes. It was a success in Germany, with Metal Hammer recognising it as the best German debut after Walls of Jericho by Helloween.

A year before releasing their second album, Roland Stahl left the band to be replaced by Matthias 'Kater' Schmitt. Shortly afterwards, Spyth Markus also decided to leave the band and was replaced by Dieter Roth. In November 1989, Paradox released their second album Heresy. The international acclaim received by the album helped to bring a worldwide fanbase to Paradox. In 1990, Markus Spyth was replaced by Kai Pasemann. From this year on, the band remained on hold for personal reasons, and continuing line-up changes did not help their activity.

The band was inactive for almost ten years. In 1998, Charly Steinhauer had plans to reform Paradox. The new line-up featured Kai Pasemann on guitar and brothers Oliver and Alex Holzwarth on bass and drums respectively. In May 2000, Paradox signed with AFM Records and released their third album Collision Course. Once again the album received positive reviews. After this album, the band again went on hiatus, this time because Steinhauer contracted a serious intestinal disease. In September 2005, he again reassembled the band, with Roland Jahoda on drums and Olly Keller on bass.

In January 2008, Paradox released their fourth album, Electrify, which became a success especially in Japan.

In October 2009, the band released its fifth album, Riot Squad, the album's main themes concerning the problems and violence present in civilization. The artwork was designed by Italian/Chilean artist Claudio Bergamin who had also created the artwork for Electrify. In December 2012, they released Tales of the Weird.

In late 2013, Paradox began working on their seventh album, which was said to be a concept album and a sequel to the band's 1989 album Heresy. However, the band stated on their Facebook page that their new album was not going to be called Heresy II; instead it was titled Pangea. Slovenian bass player Tilen Hudrap joined the band in 2015 and recorded the bass for Pangea. The album was released in June 2016 and received great reviews all over the world.

Paradox's eighth studio album, and the long-awaited sequel to Heresy, titled Heresy II – End of a Legend, was released in September 2021.

Members

Current members
 Charly Steinhauer – vocals, guitar
 Tilen Hudrap – bass
 Kostas Milonas – drums
 Christian Münzner – guitar

Past members 

Guitar
 Achim Hömerlein "Daxx"
 Martin Buchmann
 Andreas "Wuschi" Meyer
 Earl Carter
 Michael "Micky" Wehner
 Detlef Kernwein
 Markus Spyth
 Jochen Glöggler
 Dieter Roth
 Werner Wilz
 Kai Pasemann
 Fabian Schwarz
 Gus Drax
 Fabian Schwarz

Bass 
 Volker Hartmann
 Martin Stark
 Rainer Langgut
 Brian Sorensen
 Klaus "Marshall" Albert
 Roland Stahl
 Joe DiBiase
 Matthias "K.ter" Fries (Schmitt)
 Klaus Lohmeyer
 Armin Donderer
 Andi Siegl
 Olly Keller
 Armin Donderer

Drums
 Axel Blaha
 Udo Klein
 Stefan Schwarzmann
 Chris Weiss
 Roland Jahoda

Vocals
 Peter Motschiedler
 Günter Niedermeyer
 Mitch Schmitt
 Stefan Haller

Discography 
 Mystery (demo, 1987)
 Product of Imagination (1987)
 Heresy (1989)
 Collision Course (2000)
 Electrify (2008)
 Riot Squad (2009)
 Tales of the Weird (2012)
 Pangea (2016)
 Heresy II – End of a Legend (2021)

References

External links 
 

German thrash metal musical groups
German power metal musical groups
German speed metal musical groups
Musical groups established in 1986
1986 establishments in West Germany